El mar la mar is a 2017 American documentary film directed by Joshua Bonnetta and J.P. Sniadecki.

Production
The directors became interested in the subject after meeting a border guard near the Sonoran Desert. They were influenced by Jason De León's book The Land of Open Graves, about the lives and deaths of migrants who cross through the desert.

Release
The film premiered on February 11, 2017, at the 67th Berlin International Film Festival, where it won the Caligari Film Prize.

Reception

References

External links
 

2010s English-language films
2010s Spanish-language films
2017 documentary films
American documentary films
Documentary films about illegal immigration to the United States
2010s American films